Dipodomyces is a genus of fungi in the family Laboulbeniaceae. The genus contain 2 species.

References

External links
Dipodomyces at Index Fungorum

Laboulbeniomycetes